is a Japanese voice actress. She started acting in 1991 and she is affiliated with Aoni Production.

Career
She has been working as a stage actor in addition to her voice activity, as she was enrolled in a long time presided over by Nachi Nozawa, as the seat theater companies rose. She's also been active for a long time at theater presided over by a pair set by Yukimasa Kishino but in which, he has now been withdrawn from affiliation.

Filmography

Anime television series
Anpanman (xxxx) - Mochitsuki White Man (primary), and Cat (2nd generation)
Atashin'chi (2002) - Yamashita
Crayon Shin-chan (xxxx) - Ryoko
Detective Conan (2016) - Kōhei Ohno
Inuyasha (2002) - Karan
Little Ghosts, There, Here, and Where (1991) - Acchi
Marude Dameo (1991–92) - Dameo Marude
Mars Daybreak (2004) - Shie
Microman: The Small Giant (1999) - Yūta Kuji
Ranma ½ (1991) - Additional voices (Episode 98)
Sonic X (2003) - Charmy the Bee
Moomin (1990) - Yeti
World Trigger (2014) - Vittano

Anime OVAsDetective Conan: Conan and Kid and Crystal Mother (2004) - PhillipGo! Go! Ackman (1994) - AngelLet's Go! Tomica Boys (2009) - TetsuoLet's Go! Tomica Boys F5 (2010) - Tetsuo, MasmaticsMahō Sensei Negima!: Shiroki Tsubasa Ala Alba (2009) - Chachazero (episode 3)Three Little Ghosts (1991) - AcchiTokimeki Memorial (xxxx) - Yuko AsahinaTomica Daisakusen (2017) - Tkun, ToppyTomica Kingdom Story (2006) - ToppyWelcome to Pia Carrot 2 (1998) - Jun Kagurazaka

Anime filmsDoraemon: Nobita and the Winged Braves (2001) - Gusuke's Little BrotherDr. Slump and Arale-chan: N-cha! Clear Skies Over Penguin Village (1993) - Gatchans, Peasuke SoramameDr. Slump and Arale-chan: N-cha! From Penguin Village with Love (1993) - GatchansDr. Slump and Arale-chan: Hoyoyo!! Follow the Rescued Shark... (1994) - GatchansDr. Slump and Arale-chan: N-cha!! Excited Heart of Summer Vacation (1994) - GatchansGo! Go! Ackman (1994) - Tenshi-kunTomica Plarail movie festival (2013) - Tkun, Doctor, Waludakoboon

TokusatsuTokusou Sentai Dekaranger (2004) - Chanbenarian Gin

Video gamesCastlevania: Rondo of Blood (1993) - Maria RenardBattle Arena Toshinden series (1995) - Ellis, SofiaSummon Night 2 (2001) - JuelSummon Night 4 (2006) - JuelSonic the Hedgehog series - Charmy the Bee (2003-Current)Sonic Heroes (2003) Shadow the Hedgehog (2005) Mario & Sonic at the Olympic Winter Games (2009) - (Nintendo DS version)Sonic Colors (2010, Nintendo DS version)Sonic Generations (2011) Mario & Sonic at the London 2012 Olympic Games (2011) Sonic Forces (2017)NeoGeo Battle Coliseum (2005) - AiTokimeki Memorial'' (1994) - Yuko Asahina

References

External links

 Yōko Teppōzuka at GamePlaza-Haruka Voice Acting Database 
 Yōko Teppōzuka at Hitoshi Doi's Seiyuu Database

Living people
Voice actresses from Ibaraki Prefecture
Japanese voice actresses
Year of birth missing (living people)
Aoni Production voice actors
20th-century Japanese actresses
21st-century Japanese actresses